Sian Williams (born 2 February 1968) is an English former footballer and ex–manager of Watford Ladies. As a player she represented both England and Wales, and later managed Wales.

Club career
Williams played at club level for Millwall Lionesses and spent two years in Italy with Juve Siderno. She signed for Arsenal Ladies in 1990, from where she joined Charlton Athletic Ladies in September 2004.

In her 14 years at Arsenal Williams amassed numerous trophies. She captained The Gunners to their domestic treble in 2001.

International career
In 1985, she earned a senior cap for Wales, before switching to represent England.
Williams played for both England and Wales at international level. She was a non-playing member of England's 1995 FIFA Women's World Cup squad.

Coaching career
Williams joined the coaching staff at Arsenal's Centre of Excellence, later taking on a similar role at Watford, before becoming the manager of the Welsh national team in 2000.

In May 2003 Williams was highly critical of the Football Association of Wales (FAW) for pulling the women's team out of the 2005 UEFA Women's Championship qualification tournament.

Williams became manager of Watford Ladies in the 2006 close season and led the side to promotion to the FA Women's Premier League at the end of the campaign. She stood down from the post in November 2009.

Personal life
Williams' father was Alan Williams, the British Labour Party politician. She worked as a maths teacher during her career as a football player and coach.

References

1968 births
Living people
English women's footballers
England women's international footballers
English people of Welsh descent
Welsh women's footballers
Wales women's international footballers
Dual internationalists (women's football)
Millwall Lionesses L.F.C. players
Arsenal W.F.C. players
Charlton Athletic W.F.C. players
Watford F.C. Women players
FA Women's National League players
Expatriate footballers in Italy
English expatriate women's footballers
Serie A (women's football) players
English women's football managers
1995 FIFA Women's World Cup players
Women's association football midfielders